Boone is an unincorporated community in Washington County, in the U.S. state of Tennessee.

History
The community was named for pioneer Daniel Boone.

References

Unincorporated communities in Washington County, Tennessee
Unincorporated communities in Tennessee